The women's 1500 metres event  at the 1977 European Athletics Indoor Championships was held on 13 March in San Sebastián.

Results

References

1500 metres at the European Athletics Indoor Championships
1500
Euro